Remember That I Love You is Kimya Dawson's fifth solo album, released by K Records May 9, 2006. Songs include tour favorites such as "Loose Lips", "12/26", and "I Like Giants". The album art was done by Jeffrey Lewis.

In 2007, the songs "Tire Swing,", "Loose Lips," and "My Rollercoaster" were featured in the film Juno.

Track listing
All tracks were written by Kimya Dawson, except where noted.
"Tire Swing"
"My Mom"
"Loose Lips"
"Caving In"
"Better Weather"
"Underground"
"I Like Giants"
"The Competition"
"France" (Kimya Dawson, David-Ivar Herman Düne)
"I Miss You"
"12/26"
"My Rollercoaster"

Personnel
Kimya Dawson – guitar, vocals, whistling, flute, maracas, castanets, frog, organ
Paul Baribeau – vocals, keyboard
Craig Peters - keyboard, vocals
Matt Tobey – bells, vocals, ukulele
Scott Yoder - electric guitar, vocals
Jake Kelly - vocals, violin, mandolin
Donna Dear - vocals, watermelon
Saint Abbey - vocals
Erin Tobey - bells, vocals
M.J. Geier - vocals

References

2006 albums
Kimya Dawson albums
K Records albums